Martin Šúrek (born August 22, 1987) is a Slovak professional ice hockey goaltender. He currently playing a free agent having last played for Brest Albatros Hockey of the FFHG Division 1.

Šúrek previously played in the Tipsport Liga for HK Nitra, MHC Martin, ŠHK 37 Piešťany and HK Poprad. He also played in Belarus for HK Brest, Serbia for HK Partizan and in Norway for Tønsberg Vikings and Manglerud Star Ishockey before moving to France to join Scorpions de Mulhouse.

References

External links

1987 births
Living people
HK Brest players
Brest Albatros Hockey players
Manglerud Star Ishockey players
MHC Martin players
HK Nitra players
HK Partizan players
ŠHK 37 Piešťany players
Scorpions de Mulhouse players
Slovak ice hockey goaltenders
Ice hockey people from Bratislava
Tønsberg Vikings players
Slovak expatriate sportspeople in Belarus
Slovak expatriate sportspeople in Norway
Slovak expatriate sportspeople in France
Slovak expatriate sportspeople in Serbia
Expatriate ice hockey players in Serbia
Expatriate ice hockey players in Norway
Expatriate ice hockey players in Belarus
Expatriate ice hockey players in France
Slovak expatriate ice hockey people